Pangršica is a small dispersed settlement north of Kranj in the Upper Carniola region of Slovenia
.

References

External links

Pangršica on Geopedia

Populated places in the City Municipality of Kranj